The Romania men's national under-18 and under-19 basketball team is a national basketball team of Romania, administered by the Federatia Română de Baschet. It represents the country in international men's under-18 and under-19 basketball competitions.

FIBA U18 European Championship participations

FIBA Under-19 Basketball World Cup participations

See also
Romania men's national basketball team
Romania men's national under-16 basketball team
Romania women's national under-18 basketball team

References

External links
Official website 
Archived records of Romania team participations

Basketball teams in Romania
Basketball
Men's national under-18 basketball teams
Men's national under-19 basketball teams